Gökdemir is a Turkish given name for males and a Turkish surname. It may refer to:

Surname 
 Ali Gökdemir (born 1991), Azerbaijani football player of Turkish descent
 Ayvaz Gökdemir (1942–2008), Turkish politician
 Selim Gökdemir (born 1960), Turkish businessman

References 

Turkish masculine given names
Turkish-language surnames

de:Gökdemir